The 1977–78 Serie A season was won by Juventus.

Teams
Vicenza, Atalanta and Pescara had been promoted from Serie B.

Final classification

Results

Top goalscorers

References and sources
Almanacco Illustrato del Calcio - La Storia 1898-2004, Panini Edizioni, Modena, September 2005

External links
  - All results on RSSSF Website.

1977-78
Italy
1